Toronto Southeast was an Ontario provincial electoral district that existed from 1914 to 1926. It occupied an area south of College and Gerrard between University and Logan Ave. In 1926 there was a major redistribution of Ontario seats which resulted in Toronto Southeast being split between three new ridings called St. George, St. David, and Riverdale.

The riding was a dual riding in that it elected two members to the Ontario provincial legislature.

Boundaries
In 1914 the riding was created out of parts of the Toronto South and Toronto East ridings. It bordered Toronto Harbour on the south. From the western border it followed Simcoe Street north to Queen Street West where it jogged a block east to University Avenue. It went north along University to College Street. It then went east following College until it turned into Carlton Street at Yonge Street. It continued east along Carlton until it reached Parliament Street. It turned south until Gerrard Street East and then went east along Gerrard until it reached Logan Avenue. From here it went south back to Lake Ontario.

In 1926 there was a major redistribution of Ontario seats which resulted in Toronto Southeast being split between the new ridings of St. George, St. David, and Riverdale.

Members of Provincial Parliament

Election results
Elections were run as separate races for Seat A and Seat B rather than a combined race.

Seat A

Seat B

References

Notes

Citations

Former provincial electoral districts of Ontario
Provincial electoral districts of Toronto